Saadoun al-Dulaimi ( Saʿadūn ad-Dulaimī) (born 1954) is an Iraqi politician, the ex-minister of  defence for two terms, ex-minister of culture, and a former MP for two consecutive terms.

Early life and education
Saadoun Al-Dulaimi was born in Al-Anbar in 1954. He holds a master's degree in sociology from the University of Baghdad in 1979, and a PhD in social psychology from the United Kingdom in 1990.

Before the fall of Saddam's regime
After obtaining his master's degree, Al-Dulaimi worked as a lecturer at University of Baghdad, then he was sent to London to complete a doctoral degree in 1986. In addition, he worked as a lecturer in British universities, and in many Arab universities, including Saudi Arabia and Jordan. He was also selected as a key member of scientific and academic associations and conducted many types of research in Arabic and English languages.

He joined the Iraqi opposition against the rule of Saddam Hussein after the invasion of Kuwait and was sentenced to death in absentia, for his participation in a coup attempt. He participated in the opposition conferences abroad and was selected in the Coordination Committee and a follow-up conference in London in 2002.

Later career
Al-Dulaimi returned to Iraq in 2003 and established "Iraq Center for Research and Strategic Studies – ICRSS".

He served as minister of defense in the government of Ibrahim al-Jaafari, from 1 June 2005 to 6 March 2006. Then he was named advisor to the Council of Ministers in the government of Nouri al-Maliki from 15 June 2006 to the end of the Government on 20 May 2010.

In the parliamentary elections held on 7 March 2010, Al-Dulaimi won on behalf of the Unity Alliance of Iraq in Al Anbar province. He was appointed minister of culture to the government of Nouri al-Maliki, which he sworn on 21 December 2010. He was appointed the acting minister of defence on 17 August 2011.

In the parliamentary elections held on 30 April 2014, Al-Dulaimi won on behalf of the United Sons of Iraq Alliance.

In the parliamentary elections held on 12 May 2018, Saadoun won on behalf of "Alanbar is Our Identity", securing 6 out of 15 parliamentary seats. His alliance came first in the province of Alanbar

References

External links
 Iraq Center For Research and Strategic Studies, ICRSS
 Official website
 Official Twitter account

1954 births
Living people
Iraqi military personnel
Government ministers of Iraq
University of Baghdad alumni
Academic staff of the University of Baghdad
Iraqi sociologists